The Prototype Verification System (PVS) is a specification language integrated with support tools and an automated theorem prover, developed at the Computer Science Laboratory of SRI International in Menlo Park, California. 

PVS is based on a kernel consisting of an extension of Church's theory of types with dependent types, and is fundamentally a classical typed higher-order logic. The base types include uninterpreted types that may be introduced by the user, and built-in types such as the booleans, integers, reals, and the ordinals.  Type-constructors include functions, sets, tuples, records, enumerations, and abstract data types. Predicate subtypes and dependent types can be used to introduce constraints; these constrained types may incur proof obligations (called type-correctness conditions or TCCs) during typechecking.  PVS specifications are organized into parameterized theories.

The system is implemented in Common Lisp, and is released under the GNU General Public License (GPL).

See also
Formal methods
List of proof assistants

References
 Owre, Shankar, and Rushby, 1992.  PVS: A Prototype Verification System.  Published in the CADE 11 conference proceedings.

External links
 PVS website at SRI International's Computer Science Laboratory
 Summary of PVS by John Rushby at the Mechanized Reasoning database of Michael Kohlhase and Carolyn Talcott

Formal specification languages
Proof assistants
Dependently typed languages
Lisp (programming language)
Common Lisp (programming language) software
Free theorem provers
Free software programmed in Lisp
SRI International software